Castnius is a genus of moths within the family Castniidae. It was described by Jacob Hübner in 1819.

Species
 Castnius marcus (Jordan, 1908)
 Castnius pelasgus (Cramer, [1779])
 Castnius asteropoides Porion, 2004

References

Castniidae